Einar Tróndargjógv (earlier Einar Tróndargjógv Hansen, born 2 April 1988) is a Faroese footballer who plays as a defender for NSÍ Runavík. He is also a member of Faroe Islands national football team. Earlier he played for B68 Toftir.

References

External links

1988 births
Living people
People from Runavík
Faroese footballers
Faroe Islands international footballers
NSÍ Runavík players
B68 Toftir players
Association football defenders